Ari Michael Shapiro (born September 30, 1978) is an American radio journalist. In September 2015, Shapiro became one of four rotating hosts on National Public Radio's flagship drive-time program All Things Considered. He previously served as White House correspondent and international correspondent based in London for NPR.

Early life and education
Ari Shapiro was born in Fargo, North Dakota, the son of Elayne (née Halpern), a university communications professor, and Leonard Shapiro, a database researcher and university teacher. Shapiro is Jewish. When he was eight years old, he moved with his family to Beaverton, Oregon. He attended Beaverton High School. He graduated magna cum laude from Yale University in 2000 with a Bachelor of Arts degree in English. At Yale, he sang in Mixed Company of Yale and was a member of the Scroll and Key secret society.

Career
Shapiro began his NPR career as an intern to legal affairs correspondent Nina Totenberg in January 2001. Following that assignment, he worked as an editorial assistant and an assistant editor on Morning Edition. After working as a regional reporter for NPR in Atlanta and Miami and five years as NPR's Justice Correspondent, Shapiro began covering the White House in 2010. In 2014, he became NPR's correspondent in London. On July 9, 2015, NPR announced that Shapiro and Kelly McEvers would join Audie Cornish and Robert Siegel as hosts of NPR's All Things Considered program.

In June 2020, NPR announced Shapiro would co-host a new daily podcast titled Consider This.

Since 2009, Shapiro has been a regular guest singer with the band Pink Martini. He appears on four of the band's albums, singing in several languages. He made his live debut with the band at the Hollywood Bowl. He has performed live with them frequently since then, including at such venues as Carnegie Hall and the Beacon Theatre in New York City, Kennedy Center in Washington, D.C., the Olympia in Paris, Kew Gardens in London, and the Lycabettus Theatre in Athens.

In 2019, Shapiro embarked on a cabaret career, joining Alan Cumming for a show called Och & Oy! A Considered Cabaret with performances in Fire Island and Provincetown.

Recognition and awards
Shapiro's work has been recognized with journalism awards, including the American Bar Association's Silver Gavel Award, the Daniel Schorr Journalism Prize, a laurel from the Columbia Journalism Review, and the American Judges Association's American Gavel Award. Shapiro was the first NPR reporter to be promoted to correspondent before age 30.

In May 2010, the pop-culture magazine Paper included Shapiro in an annual list of "Beautiful People," saying he "must have a clone. No one man could have so many talents and be in so many places at once."

In December 2010, MSNBC's entertainment website BLTWY placed Shapiro 26th on its "power list" of "35 people under 35 who changed DC in 2010," calling him "one of NPR's fastest rising stars."

In 2016 and 2008, LGBT-themed magazine Out included Shapiro in the "Out 100", a list of "the year's most interesting, influential, and newsworthy LGBT people". Shapiro was also included on a list of openly gay media professionals in The Advocates "Forty under 40" issue of June/July 2009.

Personal life
On February 27, 2004, Shapiro and longtime boyfriend Michael Gottlieb were married at San Francisco City Hall. Gottlieb is a lawyer who worked in the office of the White House Counsel from 2013 to 2015. Shapiro and Susan Stamberg, the first co-host of All Things Considered, are cousins.

Bibliography

See also
 List of LGBT people from Portland, Oregon

References

External links
 NPR Profile - Ari Shapiro

1978 births
21st-century American journalists
American male journalists
Beaverton High School alumni
Jewish American journalists
Journalists from North Dakota
Journalists from Portland, Oregon
American LGBT broadcasters
Gay Jews
American LGBT journalists
American gay musicians
LGBT people from North Dakota
LGBT people from Oregon
American gay writers
Living people
NPR personalities
People from Fargo, North Dakota
Yale College alumni
21st-century American Jews
21st-century LGBT people